Regina Kulikova was the defending champion, but chose not to participate.

Maria Sanchez won the title, defeating Lauren Davis in the final, 6–1, 6–1.

Seeds

Main draw

Finals

Top half

Bottom half

References 
 Main Draw
 Qualifying Draw

Coleman Vision Tennis Championships - Singles
Coleman Vision Tennis Championships
2012 Coleman Vision Tennis Championships